Dennis Gehlen, also known as TaKe, is a German professional StarCraft II commentator and works as a freelancer for Turtle Entertainment which hosts ESL-TV as well as the Electronic Sports League.

He is able to rely on many famous co-casters, because of his former gaming career. Gehlen is a former Warcraft III-player, founder and manager of the clan SK06 (today known as SK Gaming). Gehlen started the Homestory Cup in 2010, a bi-annual, invitational StarCraft tournament that takes place in his apartment and features top players from all over the world.

Biography
In 2001, Gehlen started his gaming-career with the game StarCraft: Brood War but one year later changed to Warcraft III playing "Human". Later in 2002, Gehlen was able to celebrate his biggest win in a tournament (finished second in the ESL Pro Series) and won €6500.
In the next year Gehlen was not able to achieve such a good place, but in 2004 he was able to finish under the top three.

Only 19 years old, Gehlen became team-manager of his clan Team SK06. After finishing his A-Levels he started working for Turtle Entertainment and began his career as E-Sport-commentator. Furthermore, he is managing the Team Alternate and lead it to big tournaments wins in the years 2006, 2007 and 2008.

Since the beginning of the Starcraft II Beta, he began playing and commentating for his new game. In spring 2011 Gehlen became a freelancer but gets hired by Turtle Entertainment for events like the ESL Pro Series or the Homestory Cup.

Homestory Cup
The first Homestory Cup took place in September 2010 and the only players attending were Benjamin "DeMusliM“ Baker, Dennis "HasuObs“ Schneider, Giacomo "Socke“ Thüs, and Jos "ret“ de Kroon. Gehlen and Kevin "RotterdaM“ Van der Kooi cast the event with a prize money of €500. "DeMuslim“ was able to defeat the other players and to win the tournament. The event was cast from Gehlens flat which was the main reason why it was named "Homestory Cup".

Gehlen decided to acquire some sponsors, to raise the prize money to €2800 and he was able to invite eleven players to his house while five others were joining online. Gehlen and also players cast the games and viewer peaks of 20000 could be reached. White-Ra was able to win the tournament.

The third Homestory Cup took place from June 23 to 26, 2011 Because Gehlen moved to a bigger flat, it was possible to invite 32 players and the prize pool increased to €5000. Furthermore, it will be possible to watch all the matches through the ESL-site or fans can watch it directly in an Irish Pub below Gehlen's flat.

From the 12th edition the location had changed to the TakeTV studio.

 the 18th edition of Homestory cup was being planned for November 22–25 with a €20,000 prize pool.

Achievements

References

External links
 Youtube
 Readmore.de
 Prediction-gaming.net

1986 births
Living people
StarCraft commentators
StarCraft players
People from Krefeld
Warcraft III players